Giesenhausen is an Ortsgemeinde – a community belonging to a Verbandsgemeinde – in the Westerwaldkreis in Rhineland-Palatinate, Germany.

Geography

The community lies in the Westerwald between Limburg and Siegen, on the edge of the Kroppach Switzerland. The agriculturally oriented residential community of Giesenhausen belongs to the Verbandsgemeinde of Hachenburg, a kind of collective municipality. Its seat is in the like-named town.

History
In 1311, Giesenhausen had its first documentary mention.

Politics

The municipal council is made up of 8 council members who were elected in a majority vote in a municipal election in May 2014.

Regular events
The Maifest (“May Festival”), held yearly on 30 April at the grill lodge and organized by the Maijugend (“May Youth”) is a highlight in community life.

Economy and infrastructure

South of the community runs Bundesstraße 414 leading from Hohenroth to Hachenburg. The nearest Autobahn interchanges are in Siegen, Wilnsdorf and Herborn on the A 45 (Dortmund–Aschaffenburg), some 25 km away. The nearest InterCityExpress stop is the railway station at Montabaur on the Cologne-Frankfurt high-speed rail line.

References

External links
Official Homepage of Giesenhausen 
Giesenhausen in the collective municipality’s Web pages 
Giesenhausen at swr.de  

Municipalities in Rhineland-Palatinate
Westerwaldkreis